The per sign  is a rare symbol used to indicate a ratio. In English, it can replace the word "per" in phrases such as miles per hour ("miles ⅌ hour").

Unicode 
The symbol does not appear in the ASCII set.

See also 
 Wiktionary's entry on the symbol

References 

Typographical symbols